The Picó Pomar Residence, also known as Coamo Historic Museum, is a Spanish Colonial Neoclassical architecture building built in 1840, and is located on the main plaza of Coamo, Puerto Rico.  It was listed on the U.S. National Register of Historic Places in 1988.

It was purchased in 1863 by Don Clotilde Santiago, another merchant from Mallorca, who expanded it.  During the late 1800s it was one of Puerto Rico's "most active and important import-export merchandise distribution centers and the most important in the south-central region of Puerto Rico."  The business exported coffee, tobacco, and sugar, and imported manufactured goods from the U.S. and Europe.

It was later purchased by Coamo's Municipal Government and transformed into a museum.

References

External links
Explore the Amazing Collection at Coamo Museum, at The Puerto Rico Channel
Bienvenidos a Coamo, including two photos of building
Information from the National Park Service

History museums in Puerto Rico
Museums in Coamo, Puerto Rico
Houses completed in 1840
Houses on the National Register of Historic Places in Puerto Rico
Spanish Colonial architecture in Puerto Rico
Neoclassical architecture in Puerto Rico
1840 establishments in Puerto Rico
Historic house museums in Puerto Rico